Georg Julius Wilhelm Nordblad (24 August 1894 – 15 August 1970) was a Finnish sport shooter who competed in the 1924 Summer Olympics. In 1924 he won the bronze medal as member of the Finnish team in the team clay pigeons competition. He also participated in the individual trap and finished 24th.

References

External links

1894 births
1970 deaths
Finnish male sport shooters
Olympic shooters of Finland
Shooters at the 1924 Summer Olympics
Olympic bronze medalists for Finland
Trap and double trap shooters
Olympic medalists in shooting
Medalists at the 1924 Summer Olympics
Sportspeople from Helsinki